Richie James Follin is an American musician, guitarist, keyboard player, singer songwriter who has been in a number of bands.

In 2001, Follin formed and fronted The Willowz, a garage rock band based in Anaheim, California. The band's sound incorporated influences from punk, soul, and blues. He released 4 albums with them, and a fifth is to be released on Thrill Me records in this coming year.

In 2008 between releasing the third and fourth Willowz albums, Follin released a solo album featuring Taylor Dawes of Dawes. Blake Mills was on lead guitar when the group performed live. Follin also recorded and released an album with a heavy metal stoner psych punk rock group called Barracks which he fronted on lead vocals and guitar. The group was a three piece featuring Brian Oblivian of Cults and Loren Humphrey of The Willowz. The bass player for the recording was Eve Berlin of the Living Things.

In 2010, Richie Follin toured the US and Europe with The Willowz, with their supporting band for the shows being Cults which Follin was also playing guitar in. The singer for Cults is his little sister, Madeline Follin. You can hear Follin's back up vocals on the Cults song "You know what I mean".

Immediately after the Willowz / Cults tour, in 2010, he formed Guards, and released the Guards EP. They released their debut album, In Guards We Trust, in February 2013 on Black Bell records.

In 2014, Follin co-wrote "Cant stop now", and "Scream" for White Arrows album "In Bardo".

In 2015, Follin scored three short films entitled "Giving birth in America" which aired on CNN. The films were produced by Christy Turlington for her charity Every Mother Counts.

In 2016, Follin joined the American rock band CRX formed in Los Angeles in 2016, where he plays guitar, keyboards and is backing vocalist. He co-wrote the band's first single "Ways to Fake It" with Nick Valensi. of The Strokes. The band released their debut album, New Skin, through Columbia Records on October 28, 2016.

Also in 2016, Follin and his sister Madeline Follin from Cults formed a new musical project called Follin, and released a digital single and cassette tape for "Memories" btw "Roxy" through Father Daughter records.

On May 22, 2019, Follin's band, Guards, released their second album, Modern Hymns.

References

American male songwriters
Living people
Guitarists from California
1983 births
American male guitarists
21st-century American singers
21st-century American guitarists
21st-century American male singers